HSwMS Thule was a  coastal defence ship of the Royal Swedish Navy.

Thule was launched on 4 March 1893 at Bergsunds Yard in Stockholm. She was struck from service in 1928, and broken up in 1933.

Captains
1904–1904 – Carl Alarik Wachtmeister

References

1893 ships
Ships built in Stockholm
Svea-class coastal defence ships